Gelber Berg is a mountain of Bavaria, Germany. The plateau was fortified during the 10th to 8th century BC, in the 6th century BC and during the Migration Period around 400-500 AD.

Mountains of Bavaria
Mountains and hills of the Franconian Jura